Molinia, or moor grass, is a genus of two species of flowering plants in the grass family, native to damp moorland in Eurasia and northern Africa. They are both herbaceous perennial grasses.

The genus is named after Juan Ignacio Molina, a 19th-century Chilean naturalist.

 Species
 Molinia caerulea (L.) Moench - (purple moor grass) - Eurasia + northern Africa from Ireland + Morocco to Ethiopia + Kazakhstan; naturalized in parts of United States + Canada
 Molinia japonica Hack. (Japanese moor grass) - Japan, Korea, Anhui, Zhejiang, Sakhalin, Kuril

 formerly included
see Arctophila Catabrosa Cleistogenes Diarrhena Disakisperma Festuca Glyceria Poa Puccinellia

References

Molinieae
Bunchgrasses of Africa
Bunchgrasses of Asia
Bunchgrasses of Europe
Garden plants
Poaceae genera